Fárbauti is a jötunn in Norse mythology. In all sources, he is portrayed as the father of Loki. Fárbauti is attested in the Prose Edda, written in the 13th century by Snorri Sturluson, and in kennings of Viking Age skalds.

Name 
The Old Norse name  has been translated as 'dangerous striker', 'anger striker', or 'sudden-striker'. It is a compound formed with the noun  ('hostility, danger, unfortunateness, falseness') attached to the verb  ('to strike').

Attestations 

Two 10th-century skalds call Loki "son of Fárbauti", using, however, the poetic word mögr for 'son' rather than the usual sonr.

The skald Úlfr Uggason is quoted referring to Loki as "Fárbauti's terribly sly son", and the skald Þjóðólfr of Hvinir mentions Loki as "Fárbauti's son".

In Gylfaginning ('The Beguiling of Gylfi'), the enthroned figure of High states that Loki is the son of the jötunn Fárbauti, and that "Laufey or Nál is his mother".

In Skáldskaparmál ('The Language of Poetry'), Fárbauti is mentioned among kennings referring to his son Loki.

Theories
Axel Kock has proposed Fárbauti's name and character may have been inspired by the observation of the natural phenomena surrounding the appearance of wildfire. If Fárbauti as "dangerous striker" refers to "lightning", the figure would appear to be part of an early nature myth alluding to wildfire (Loki) being produced by lightning (Fárbauti) striking dry tinder such as leaves (Laufey) or pine needles (Nál).

Although only indirectly attested in a kenning of Völuspá ('Prophecy of the Völva') mentioning Loki as "Byleist’s brother", some scholars have considered Loki's brothers Helblindi and Býleistr to also be sons of Fárbauti. However, their exact role in the presumably ancient mythic complex surrounding Loki's family remains largely unclear.

Notes

References

Guelpa, Patrick (2009). Dieux & Mythes Nordique. Presses Universitaires du Septentrion. .
Kock, Axel (1899). "Etymologisch-mythologische Untersuchungen" in: Brugmann, K. & Streitberg, W. (Eds.) Indogermanische Forschungen: Zeitschrift für indogermanische Sprach- und Altertumskunde, Vol. 10, pp. 90–111. Strassburg: Karl J. Trübner.

Rydberg, Viktor (2003). Our Father's Godsaga: Retold for the Young. Lincoln: iUniverse. .

Sykes, Egerton (2002). Who's Who in Non-Classical Mythology. New York: Routledge. .

Jötnar
Loki
Lightning